Earl Clinton "Jug" Bennett (February 27, 1920 – September 28, 1992) is a former guard in the National Football League.

Biography
Bennett was born Earl Clinton Bennett Jr. in 1920 in Skiatook, Oklahoma. He was given the nickname "Jug".

Career
Bennett was drafted by the Green Bay Packers in the twenty-third round of the 1943 NFL Draft and later played with the team during the 1946 NFL season. He played at the collegiate level at Hardin–Simmons University.

See also
List of Green Bay Packers players

References

1920 births
1992 deaths
American football offensive guards
Green Bay Packers players
Hardin–Simmons Cowboys football players
People from Skiatook, Oklahoma
Players of American football from Oklahoma